Gabriel M'Boa is a Central African Republic long-distance runner. He competed in the men's 5000 metres at the 1968 Summer Olympics.

References

Year of birth missing (living people)
Living people
Athletes (track and field) at the 1968 Summer Olympics
Central African Republic male long-distance runners
Olympic athletes of the Central African Republic
Place of birth missing (living people)